Mircea Dincă (born 1980) is a Romanian-American inorganic chemist. He is a Professor of Chemistry and W. M. Keck Professor of Energy at the Massachusetts Institute of Technology (MIT). At MIT, Dincă leads a research group that focuses on the synthesis of functional metal-organic frameworks (MOFs), which possess conductive, catalytic, and other material-favorable properties.

Early life and education
Mircea Dincă was born in Făgăraș, Romania. His passion for chemistry began in his chemistry class in 7th grade, where he had a "dedicated teacher that did spectacular demonstrations with relatively limited regard for safety". In 1998, he represented Romania at the International Science Olympiad (Chemistry) in Yakutsk, Russia, where he won first prize.

After high school, Dincă was offered a scholarship from Princeton University and moved to New Jersey in 1999. At Princeton, he worked with Jeffrey Schwartz, conducting research on materials science. After graduating magna cum laude in 2003, Dincă went on to the University of California, Berkeley to attend the Chemistry doctorate program, where he worked with chemistry professor Jeffrey R. Long on increasing H2 adsorption in metal-organic frameworks with mobile hydrogen storage applications. He graduated with his Ph.D. from Berkeley in 2008.

Career 
Dincă completed his postdoc studies at MIT, where he was promoted to associate professor in 2010 and, in 2017, tenured.

Research 
Dincă's research primarily focuses on electrical conductivity of MOF's, which was previously unknown and resulted in a new categorization of such materials with "charge mobility values". His focus is on the exploration of increasing electrical conductivity capacities through the marriage of organic and inorganic materials to assemble hybrid MOF's.

Research includes exploring electrochemical cycling through strongly adhering, electroactive metal–organic framework thin films to vary results, such as multicolored electrochromic responses and transparent to dark behavior.

References 

1980 births
Living people
People from Făgăraș
Romanian chemists
21st-century Romanian scientists
21st-century chemists
Princeton University alumni
University of California, Berkeley alumni
Massachusetts Institute of Technology School of Science faculty
Sloan Research Fellows
Romanian expatriates in the United States
Expatriate academics in the United States
Solid state chemists